Rattlesnake Hill is a mountain located in the Catskill Mountains of New York southeast of Hancock. Jensen Hill is located south, Bouchoux Hill is located southwest, Big Fork Mountain is located northeast, and Johnny Ridge is located north-northwest of Rattlesnake Hill.

References

Mountains of Delaware County, New York
Mountains of New York (state)